James Smith (born September 2, 1977) is an American sports broadcaster and former mixed martial artist. He was the co-host of the television show Fight Quest, with Doug Anderson, on the Discovery Channel. He is also a former commentator for Bellator, UFC, Premier Boxing Champions and WWE’s Raw brand. He is a former host for American Ninja Warrior in 2010–2011.

Early life
Smith was born on September 2, 1977. He was a former high school wrestler and teacher. He attended UCLA in college but at that time, they did not have a wrestling team so some students who wrestled in high school would meet at the Wooden Center to wrestle. He was introduced to Brazilian jiu-jitsu when during one of their wrestling sessions a BJJ instructor invited him to attend a class that night at the same room. After graduating Smith trained at Team Punishment.

Mixed martial arts career
Smith had planned to attend graduate school at UCLA but did not get admitted. He decided to turn pro in MMA and accepted a fight on 2 days' notice in a regional unsanctioned event, he won the fight in 30 seconds with an armbar. He had a total of 6 MMA fights and only lost 1. He decided to quit fighting after getting accepted for a job as a host for the Discovery Channel's show Fight Quest.

Commentary career

Mixed martial arts and boxing
Smith got an audition for Fight Quest a week after his last fight and got the job. He hosted Fight Quest for 2 seasons with Doug Anderson. It last aired on October 3, 2008. After Fight Quest, he received an email from Pride's former VP, Jerry Millen, to do an M-1 Global show in Amsterdam as they needed a color commentator last-minute. Millen had seen Fight Quest and sent a message to both Smith and Anderson and whoever got back first would have gotten the job. He got the job and that's how he transitioned from MMA to hosting to commentating. In 2010, Smith started to be the color commentator for Bellator in season 2 after their TV-deal agreements with Fox Sports Net, NBC and Telemundo. In the same year, Smith started to host American Ninja Warrior for its second season. Smith co-hosted American Ninja Warrior until the third season before being replaced by Jonny Moseley for the fourth season. On March 13, 2015, Smith provided co-hosting duties together with former boxing champion Antonio Tarver for Premier Boxing Champions. On December 28, 2017, Bellator announced that they have parted ways with Smith after a 7-year run.

On January 12, 2018, Smith signed with the UFC. On January 1, 2019, Smith revealed that UFC did not renew his contract as a commentator.

On March 8, 2019, it was announced that Smith joined Invicta FC as a commentator.

Professional wrestling
On May 26, 2021, WWE named Smith as play-by-play commentator for Monday Night Raw, replacing Adnan Virk. On October 6, 2022, Smith announced his departure from WWE.

Personal life
Smith has a black belt in Brazilian jiu-jitsu under Ricardo "Rey" Diogo.

Mixed martial arts record 

|-
|Win
|align=center|5–1
|Jason Chambers
|Submission (heel hook)
|Pangea Fights 1: The Beginning
|
|align=center|1
|align=center|1:55
|Hollywood, California, United States
|
|-
|Loss
|align=center|4–1
|Andy Wang
|Decision (split)
|Total Fighting Alliance 2
|
|align=center|3
|align=center|5:00
|Carson, California, United States
|
|-
|Win
|align=center|4–0
|Vince Gooseman 
|Submission (armbar)
|King of the Cage 61: Flash Point 
|
|align=center|1
|align=center|2:50
|San Jacinto, California, United States
|
|-
|Win
|align=center|3–0
|Mario Ackerbert
|Submission (armbar)
|Gladiator Challenge 36: Proving Grounds 
|
|align=center|1
|align=center|0:29
|California, United States
|
|-
|Win
|align=center|2–0
|James Wilks
|Submission (kneebar)
|King of the Cage 37: Hitmaster 
|
|align=center|1
|align=center|1:40
|San Jacinto, California, United States
|
|-
|Win
|align=center|1–0
|Matt Stansell
|Decision 
|King of the Cage 31
|
|align=center|2
|align=center|5:00
|San Jacinto, California, United States
|
|-

References

External links

1977 births
American color commentators
American male mixed martial artists
American podcasters
American male sport wrestlers
Amateur wrestlers
Mixed martial artists from California
American practitioners of Brazilian jiu-jitsu
People awarded a black belt in Brazilian jiu-jitsu
Mixed martial arts people
Welterweight mixed martial artists
Mixed martial artists utilizing wrestling
Mixed martial artists utilizing boxing
Mixed martial artists utilizing Brazilian jiu-jitsu
Living people
People from Fresno, California
Professional wrestling announcers
WWE Raw